The Balmoral Burn is an annual foot race in Sydney, Australia.

History
Created by former Wallaby captain Phil Kearns, the first Burn was run in 2001, and now an annual event run in May/June each year. Kearns started the race after his son's treatment at Royal North Shore Hospital, it has become a fundraising event for children's health services in Australia and East Timor.

Location
The race is run up Awaba Street, Mosman, Sydney, Australia. Awaba Street is one of Sydney’s steepest streets.

According to the Sunday Telegraph, the street has a slope of 20º.

Participation
The Balmoral Burn is fun family day out with races for elite runners, school children, corporate teams, disabled athletes, parents with prams, pets and their owners, and others.

In excess of 11,000 people participate in the Burn each year.

Winners

In the 2012 edition Paralympic champion Kurt Fearnley came first in the Para Burn with a time of five minutes and 26 seconds.

Fund Raising
The event has become an annual fundraising event for the Humpty Dumpty Foundation, a charity providing children’s health services, which buys essential medical equipment for Neonatal Units and Paediatric Wards in hospitals and health service centres across Australia and East Timor.

The money was initially used for basic equipment such as stethoscopes and infant beds, but the program has expanded to buy ambulances and more specialized equipment. Over A$3 million was raised from the Burn in 2012 alone.

References

External links 
 Humpty Dumpty Foundation - Balmoral Burn

Sports competitions in Sydney
Road running competitions
Recurring sporting events established in 2000
Athletics competitions in Australia
2000 establishments in Australia